A list of films produced in Egypt in 1959. For an A-Z list of films currently on Wikipedia, see :Category:Egyptian films.

External links
 Egyptian films of 1959 at the Internet Movie Database
 Egyptian films of 1959 elCinema.com

Lists of Egyptian films by year
1959 in Egypt
Lists of 1959 films by country or language